Mormon Row is a historic district in Teton County, Wyoming, United States that is listed on the National Register of Historic Places.

Description

The district consists of a line of homestead complexes along the Jackson-Moran Road near the southeast corner of Grand Teton National Park, in the valley called Jackson Hole. The rural historic landscape's period of significance includes the construction of the Andy Chambers, T.A. Moulton and John Moulton farms from 1908 to the 1950s. Six building clusters and a separate ruin illustrate Mormon settlement in the area and comprise such features as drainage systems, barns, fields and corrals.  Apart from John and T.A. Moulton, other settlers in the area were Joseph Eggleston, Albert Gunther, Henry May, Thomas Murphy and George Riniker.

The area is also known as Antelope Flats, situated between the towns of Moose and Kelly.  It is a popular destination for tourists and photographers on account of the historic buildings, the herds of bison, and the spectacular Teton Range rising in the background.  The alluvial soil to the east of Blacktail Butte was more suitable than most locations in Jackson Hole for farming, somewhat hampered by a lack of readily available water. The Mormon homesteaders began to arrive in the 1890s from Idaho, creating a community called "Gros Ventre", with a total of 27 homesteads. The Mormon settlers tended to create clustered communities, in contrast to the isolated homesteads more typical of Jackson Hole.

The Mormon Row district was added to the National Register of Historic Places on June 5, 1997.

See also

 National Register of Historic Places listings in Grand Teton National Park
 National Register of Historic Places listings in Teton County, Wyoming
 Historical buildings and structures of Grand Teton National Park
 Andy Chambers Ranch Historic District
 The Church of Jesus Christ of Latter-day Saints in Wyoming

References

External links

 Mormon Row at Grand Teton National Park
 
 
 Mormon Row Historic District at the Wyoming State Historic Preservation Office

 
19th-century Mormonism
Latter Day Saint movement in Wyoming
Buildings and structures in Grand Teton National Park
Historic American Buildings Survey in Wyoming
Populated places established in 1927
Farms on the National Register of Historic Places in Wyoming
Historic districts on the National Register of Historic Places in Wyoming